Sport Vereniging Robinhood is a Surinamese football club based in Paramaribo that competes in the SVB Eerste Divisie, the highest level of football in Suriname. Founded on 6 February 1945, Robinhood is the most successful club in Surinamese football, having won a record 24 league titles, and a record of five Beker van Surinames and President's Cups apiece. The club was the first Surinamese club to make the final of a North American tournament, reaching the 1972 CONCACAF Champions' Cup final. Though making five CONCACAF club championship finals in their history, Robinhood has never won a continental title.

A majority of the club's success was during the 1970s and 1980s at the helm of longtime manager, Ronald Kolf, who led the club to the 30 of 31 honors received. Following Kolf's departure in 2003, many cite a regression in Robinhood's form, as the club has failed to win any major trophy since 2005, when the club earned the double with the Hoofdklasse and Beker van Suriname titles.

SV Robinhood was appointed by the IFFHS, as one of the Twenty clubs in the 20th century. getting third place in the tenth.

In 2014, Robinhood was relegated to the Eerste Klasse (second division). The 2014–15 campaign was the first time the club had played outside of the first division since 1948. After one season in the Eerste Klasse, Robinhood won the relegation play-offs and was promoted back to the Hoofdklasse.

History

Foundation

SV Robinhood was founded by Anton Blijd on 6 February 1945. The original purpose of the club was to offer poorer boys and men living in central Paramaribo a chance to participate in a community activity. The distinct origins of the name "Robinhood" are not entirely known, but it has been reported that a man named J. Nelom proposed that the club be given the name. Nelom, who originally named the club, served as Robinhood's first chairman, although it is unknown what years he chaired the club.

Founded in 1945 as a recreational team, Robinhood entered the Tweede Klasse, or the third tier of Surinamese football in 1946, which was the Surinamese Football Association's first organized barefoot league.  Originally, in spite of early success in the third flight of Surinamese football, the club was denied entry into the second tier, or Eerste Klasse because the second division required players to wear boots. The subsequent season, Robinhood won the 1947 title over SV Urania, and won a dozen pairs of boots, allowing them to participate in the Eerste Klasse. The club's humble roots,  earned them much popularity in the Paramaribo area, and quickly developed a large fanbase, as well as the theme Geen strijd, geen kroon, Dutch for "No Fight, No Crown".

The club continued to ascend the flights of Surinamese football, eventually reaching the Hoofdklasse, the top Surinamese football league, in 1949. Following three consecutive runners-up in from 1950 through 1952, the club won their first Hoofdklasse title in 1953 upon beating Transvaal, 5–0. The victory, is cited to have been the budding of a bitter rivalry between Robinhood and Transvaal, as the two would jockey one another for the title of being the supreme club of Suriname.

Ever since Robinhood won promotion into the 1949 Hoofdklasse season, the club has never been relegated from the top flight of Surinamese football.

In 1952 Robinhood became soccer champions of Suriname.  The manager was Jules Gersie. During the tenure of this very skilful trainer Robinhood won four league titles in the highest division With many star players including Humphrey Mijnals and Charley Marbach. Robinhood is the only club with so many titles after its name and one of the most popular in Suriname. In its 57th year history the club was crowned champions 22 times of which 15 titles were won with Ronald "Ro" Kolf as the manager. Robinhood always was one of the progressive clubs in Suriname.

They were the first with a clubhouse (opened on May 10, 1953 while the club was run by the late doctor Doelwijt). On February 6, 1980 (44th year of existence) Robinhood opened the most modern clubhouse (of that time) at the verlengde Gemenelandsweg. The chairman was veterinarian Robbie Lieuw A Joe. Also in this 10-year period Robinhood won the league title 9 times out of the possible 10 dominating soccer in Suriname.

1976: First trip to Europe
In 1976, Robinhood travelled to Europe for the first time, scheduling games in the Netherlands against Dutch Eredivisie clubs Ajax, Feyenoord, NEC, Den Haag, Elinkwijk and HFC Haarlem. Robinhood became the first club since Transvaal make the trip over the pond, finishing with 2 wins, 2 draws and 2 losses overall.

Tour results

1970s and 1980s

To fans and the media, the 1970s and the 1980s were widely considered the most successful years for S.V. Robinhood. Between 1975 and 1989 Robinhood won the Hoofdklasse title fourteen times in those sixteen seasons.

The club's success also translated on the subcontinental and continental stages, where Robinhood won the Caribbean Zone titles in 1976 and 1977. In those same seasons they would finish as runners-up in the now-defunct CONCACAF Champions' Cup.

During this Golden Age, the lowest the club ever finished in the Hoofdklasse was a third-place finish in 1982, which during that season, the club made their third trip to the Champions Cup, losing the 1982 final to Mexico's UNAM Pumas 3–2 on aggregate. The subsequent tournament, Robinhood made the finals upon winning the Caribbean title for a second consecutive year, defeating the Curaçao League champions SUBT, by a 4–1 aggregate scoreline. In the championship, Robinhood took on Mexico's Atlante where they lost 6–1 on aggregate. To this date, it would be the deepest in a CONCACAF tournament Robinhood would reach.

During the late 1980s, Robinhood would play a chain of friendlies against Dutch Eredivisie giants, Ajax, where they would win a match and lose a match only by a 4–3 scoreline. During the mid-to-late 1980s, the club grew its infrastructure setting up a youth development academy.

1986: Second trip to Europe
In 1986, Robinhood travelled to Europe once more, 10 years after their previous excursion, scheduling games in the Netherlands against Dutch Eredivisie clubs Ajax, Excelsior, PEC Zwolle, HFC Haarlem, FC Volendam and the Kleurrijk XI (Dutch, "Colorful XI"), an unofficial team of Surinamese expatriates living in the Netherlands. Robinhood finished the tour with 1 win, 2 draws and 3 losses overall.

Tour results

1990s
Robinhood won two more league title in this decade in 1993–94 and 1994–95 they were also runners-up four times. With many changes in the team due to players leaving for Holland and other countries. Robinhood relied on youngsters coming through the system, Marcel Reidewald, Johan Vorstwijk and Ricardo Anches. This was a period of transition and a rocky one for the great supporters of Binhood. The season they finished Runner-up to the army team (SNL) Robert "Muis" Lawrence set a Hoofdklasse goalscoring record of thirty goals in a season, this still stands to this day.

Ludwig van Dijk era
This has been a mixed period with the twenty-third title coming in 2004–05 season (under the coach Ricardo Winter) and runners-up position in three other season it's not been a bad return. Football changed a lot in this decade with other teams coming into the picture, traditional teams like Leo Victor, Transvaal and Voorwaarts have been replaced with the likes of Inter Moengotapoe and Walking Boyz. The Robinhood team has changed much in this period also but has had some stars like Gordon Kinsaini, Hesdy Jap A Joe and the giant at the heart of the defence Marcel Reidewald. These players have all gone now and it is a new generation on the playing field, Arnold Burleson is coach and there are signs that the club will return to the dominant position it held through their history.

Relegation in the First Division
In 2014, after almost 70 years in Suriname's elite, it dropped to the Second Division

Crest and colours
SV Robinhood's crest is a circular badge with two swords meeting together in an upright angle. Along the border, the crest reads the club's name and foundation year. Above the two meeting swords is a soccer ball.

Throughout the club's existence, the colours have been green, red and accents of white to reflect on the colours of present-day Suriname.

Players

First-team squad 2022

Notable coaches

 Jules Gersie (1952–57)
 Humphrey Mac Nack (1958–68)
 Leo Schipper (1968–69)
 Ronald Kolf (1969–03)
 Andy Atmodimedjo (2003–04)
 Ricardo Winter (2004–05)
 Arno Burleson (2010–11)
 Roy Vanenburg (2011–12)
 Dwight Renfrum (2012–?)
 Roberto Godeken(2017–)

Stadium

For as long as the stadium has existed, SV Robinhood have played their home matches in the 6,000-seater André Kamperveen Stadion. Shared with rivals Transvaal and Walking Boyz Company, Kamperveen Stadion is one of the few all grass pitches in Suriname. Prior to the construction of the Kamperveen Stadion, Robinhood played their home matches at the Flora Stadion which would later become the Dr. Ir. Franklin Essed Stadion. The Essed Stadion later became the home stadium of Robinhood once more, after the team relegated for the first time in the club's history, becoming tenants of the Essed Stadion since 2014.

Honours

Domestic
SVB Topklasse
Champions: (25) 1953, 1954, 1955, 1956, 1958–59, 1964, 1971, 1975, 1976, 1979, 1980, 1981, 1983, 1984, 1985, 1986, 1987, 1988, 1989, 1993–94, 1994–95, 2004–05, 2011–12, 2017–18, 2022
Beker van Suriname
Champions: (7) 1996–97, 1998–99, 2000–01, 2005–06, 2006–07, 2015–16, 2017–18
Suriname President's Cup
Champions: (7) 1994, 1995, 1996, 1999, 2001, 2016, 2018

Continental
CONCACAF Champions' Cup
Runners-up: (5) 1972, 1976, 1977, 1982, 1983
CFU Club Championship
Runners-up: (1) 2005
Caribbean Club Shield
Champions: (1) 2019

Seasons

Performance in CONCACAF  competitions

CONCACAF Champions' Cup
1972 CONCACAF Champions' Cup
Final (2nd place) v.  Olimpia – 0:1, 0:0

1974 CONCACAF Champions' Cup
First Round (Caribbean Region) v.  Jong Colombia – 2:2, 0:1

1976 CONCACAF Champions' Cup
First Round (Caribbean Region) v.  Jong Colombia – 3:1, 1:1
Second Round (Caribbean Region) v.  Malvern United – 0:0, 2:0
Final (2nd place) v.  Águila – 1:5, 2:3

1977 CONCACAF Champions' Cup
First Round (Caribbean Region) v.  YMCA – 5:0, 1:0
Second Round (Caribbean Region) v.  Voorwaarts – 1:0, 1:0
Third Round (Caribbean Region) v.  Violette – 0:0, 1:0
Fourth Round (Caribbean Region) v.  TECSA – 0:0, 1:0
Final (2nd place) v.  América – 0:1, 1:1

1979 CONCACAF Champions' Cup
Third Round (Caribbean Region) v.  Tesoro Palo Seco – 2:0, 1:0
Fourth Round (Caribbean Region) v.  Jong Colombia – 0:0, 0:1

1980 CONCACAF Champions' Cup
First Round (Caribbean Region) v.  SUBT – 1:2, 4:0
Second Round (Caribbean Region) v.  Defence Force – :, :
Third Round (Caribbean Region) v.  Transvaal – :, :
Triangular Final v.  Pumas UNAM – 0:2
Triangular Final (3rd place) v.  Universidad – 1:1

1983 CONCACAF Champions' Cup
First Round (Caribbean Region) v.  Defence Force – 1:0, 2:1
Second Round (Caribbean Region) v.  Dakota – 5:1, 0:0
Third Round (Caribbean Region) v.  SUBT – 2:1, 2:0
Final (2nd place) v.  Atlante – 1:1, 0:5

1986 CONCACAF Champions' Cup
First Round (Caribbean South Region) v.  Juventus – 5:0, 4:0
First Round (Caribbean South Region) v.  Transvaal – 2:2, 0:1

1988 CONCACAF Champions' Cup
First Round (Caribbean Region) v.  Cardinals – :, :
Second Round (Caribbean Region) v.  Zenith – 1:3, 4:0
Semi-finals v.  Defence Force – 0:0, 0:2

1990 CONCACAF Champions' Cup
First Round (Caribbean Region) v.  Transvaal – 0:0, 1:2

1992 CONCACAF Champions' Cup
First Round (Caribbean Region) v.  ASC Le Geldar – 0:1, 2:0
Second Round (Caribbean Region) v.  Mayaro United – 2:0, 0:1
Third Round (Caribbean Region) v.  L'Etoile de Morne-à-l'Eau – 1:3, 3:0
Semi-finals v.  América – 0:7

1993 CONCACAF Champions' Cup
First Round (Caribbean Region) v.  AS Club Colonial – 0:1, 2:0
Second Round (Caribbean Region) v.  Sithoc – 1:2, 3:0
Third Round (Caribbean Region) v.  Trintoc – 1:0, 0:0
Fourth Round (Caribbean Region) v.  Aiglon du Lamentin – 0:1, 3:1
Final Tournament v.  Municipal – 0:3
Final Tournament v.  León – 0:4
Final Tournament v.  Saprissa – 1:9

1994 CONCACAF Champions' Cup
Preliminary Round (Caribbean Region) v.  RCA – 1:2, 7:0
First Round (Caribbean Region) v.  Leo Victor – 1:0, 2:4

CONCACAF Cup Winners Cup
CONCACAF Cup Winners Cup: 1 appearance
1996 – Qualifying stage (Caribbean Zone)

CFU Club Championship
2000 CFU Club Championship
First Round v.  Sithoc – 2:2
First Round v.  Joe Public – 0:5
First Round v.  Harlem Bombers – 5:2

2003 CFU Club Championship
Withdrew

2005 CFU Club Championship
First Round v.  Britannia – 2:1, 2:0
Quarter-finals v.  North East Stars – :, :
Semi-finals v.  Northern United – 3:1, 4:2
Final (2nd place) v.  Portmore United – 2:1, 0:4

Caribbean Club Shield
2019 Caribbean Club Shield
Group Stage v.  Club Franciscain – 1:3
Group Stage v.  Dakota – 4:1
Quarter-finals v.  Village Superstars – 1:1
Semi-finals v.  Weymouth Wales – 3:0
Final v.  Club Franciscain – 1:0

CONCACAF League 2019 playoff

v. Real Hope   — 1:1

3-1 on penalties

CONCACAF League
2019 CONCACAF League
Preliminary round: v.  AS Capoise – 0:0, 1:1 (a)

Round of 16: v.  Independiente – 1:1, 1:2

References
General
 Club honors cited to: 
Notes

 
Robinhood
1945 establishments in Suriname
Association football clubs established in 1945